Leo Lerinc (born 30 December 1975) is a Serbian former footballer who played as a midfielder.

Career
A graduate of the youth system at his hometown club Vojvodina, Lerinc made his first-team debut in 1994. He was a regular member of the team that reached the finals of the 1998 UEFA Intertoto Cup. During the 1999 winter transfer window, Lerinc signed with Red Star Belgrade. He spent three and a half seasons at Marakana, winning two championship titles and three national cup trophies.

In August 2002, Lerinc moved abroad and joined Swiss side St. Gallen. He made 13 league appearances and scored one goal in the 2002–03 season, as the club suffered relegation from the top flight. After six months without competitive football, Lerinc signed with Spanish side Ciudad Murcia in January 2004.

In October 2007, just four months upon his return to Vojvodina, Lerinc announced his retirement from football due to chronic injuries.

Personal life
Lerinc is the son of fellow footballer Laslo Lerinc.

Honours
Red Star Belgrade 
First League of FR Yugoslavia: 1999–2000, 2000–01
FR Yugoslavia Cup: 1998–99, 1999–2000, 2001–02
Dinamo București
Liga I: 2006–07

References

External links
 
 
 

Association football midfielders
Ciudad de Murcia footballers
Cypriot First Division players
Ethnikos Achna FC players
Expatriate footballers in Cyprus
Expatriate footballers in Romania
Expatriate footballers in Spain
Expatriate footballers in Switzerland
FC Dinamo București players
FC St. Gallen players
First League of Serbia and Montenegro players
FK Vojvodina players
Liga I players
Red Star Belgrade footballers
Segunda División players
Serbia and Montenegro expatriate footballers
Serbia and Montenegro expatriate sportspeople in Cyprus
Serbia and Montenegro expatriate sportspeople in Spain
Serbia and Montenegro expatriate sportspeople in Switzerland
Serbia and Montenegro footballers
Serbian expatriate footballers
Serbian expatriate sportspeople in Romania
Serbian footballers
Serbian people of Hungarian descent
Serbian SuperLiga players
Footballers from Novi Sad
Swiss Super League players
1975 births
Living people